Hood Famous Cafe and Bar, also known as Hood Famous Bakeshop or simply Hood Famous, is a Filipino bakery with two locations in Seattle, in the U.S. state of Washington. Operating in Ballard and the Chinatown–International District (C-ID), the business is co-owned by spouses Chera Amlag and Geo Quibuyen of Blue Scholars (also known as Prometheus Brown).

Description 
Hood Famous is an Asian Pacific American-owned business in Seattle specializing in Filipino cuisine. The menu has included ube (purple yam) cheesecake and cookies, buko pie, calamansi bars, cassava cake, longanisa chive scones, ensaymada (Filipino brioche bun with cheese), pandesal, pandan flan, and other desserts and pastries. The business also serves arroz caldo, beef mechado pot pie, and coffee. Cocktails include calamansi sours and ube daiquiris. For Thanksgiving, the C-ID location has served gluten-free pumpkin cake with pinipig and oat streusel.

History 
Chera Amlag founded the business and began wholesaling to Uwajimaya in 2014. She opened a first storefront in 2016. The C-ID location opened in 2019. The business also launched an apparel line in 2019. Janelle Quiyuben is creative director of Hood Famous as of 2020.

Reception 
Rachel Hopke included Hood Famous in Eater Seattle's 2021 list of eight "sensational shops" in Seattle for cold brew. The website's Gabe Guarente and Jade Yamazaki Stewart included the business in a 2022 overview of "Where to Find Fantastic Filipino Food Around the Seattle Area". Aleenah Ansari included Hood Famous in Insider.com's 2022 list of "12 restaurants you shouldn't miss in Seattle, according to a local who has eaten their way around the city."

See also

 Filipino-American cuisine

References

External links 

 

2014 establishments in Washington (state)
Asian restaurants in Seattle
Bakeries of Washington (state)
Ballard, Seattle
Chinatown–International District, Seattle
Filipino-American culture